The Fiat 6 HP is a car produced by the Italian manufacturer Fiat from 1900 to 1901. The 6 HP was introduced after Fiat's original Fiat 4 HP, and, alongside the increased horsepower, the vehicle was changed from the original with its reverse gear and uses rear-wheel drive. Fiat also produced a special racing model, the 6 HP Corsa. The Corsa was driven in competition by noted drivers, including Vincenzo Lancia and Felice Nazzaro. This version was the first racing car produced by Fiat.

References 

6 HP
Cars introduced in 1900
Veteran vehicles
1900s cars